is a Japanese professional footballer who plays as a midfielder for Indonesian club Borneo Samarinda.

Career statistics

Club

Notes

References

1995 births
Living people
Japanese footballers
Japanese expatriate footballers
Association football midfielders
TV Jahn Hiesfeld players
Lija Athletic F.C. players
Mosta F.C. players
Persela Lamongan players
Borneo F.C. players
Johor Darul Ta'zim II F.C. players
Maltese Premier League players
Liga 1 (Indonesia) players
Malaysia Premier League players
Japanese expatriate sportspeople in Germany
Expatriate footballers in Germany
Japanese expatriate sportspeople in Indonesia
Expatriate footballers in Indonesia
Japanese expatriate sportspeople in Malta
Expatriate footballers in Malta
Japanese expatriate sportspeople in Malaysia
Expatriate footballers in Malaysia